Hadillah Mohoumadi (born 11 August 1980) is a French professional boxer who has held the European super-middleweight title twice between 2015 and 2018.

Professional career
Mohoumadi made his professional debut on 19 December 2008, scoring a third-round stoppage over Daniel Pavelescu. On 22 October 2010, Mohoumadi suffered his first loss to Cristian Sanavia in an eight-round points decision. Having fought mainly in France, the first opportunity for Mohoumadi to fight for a major regional title came on 13 October 2012, against European super-middleweight champion James DeGale, who won a hard-fought unanimous decision (UD).

Mohoumadi would score four wins in 2013, but spent the following year inactive as he chose to wait for a second chance at the European super-middleweight title. This finally arrived on 29 May 2015, when Mohoumadi stopped Mariano Hilario in eight rounds to win the vacant title. In his first defence as champion, on 2 April 2016, Mohoumadi was stopped in one round by undefeated challenger Callum Smith. Smith would later vacate the title, with Mohoumadi regaining it on 5 May 2017 after a UD against Mariano Hilario.

Professional boxing record

References

External links

French male boxers
Super-middleweight boxers
1980 births
Living people
European Boxing Union champions